2-hydroxy-6-oxonona-2,4-dienedioate hydrolase (mhpC (gene)) is an enzyme with systematic name (2Z,4E)-2-hydroxy-6-oxona-2,4-dienedioate succinylhydrolase. This enzyme catalyses the following chemical reaction:

 (2Z,4E)-2-hydroxy-6-oxonona-2,4-diene-1,9-dioate + H2O  (2Z)-2-hydroxypenta-2,4-dienoate + succinate
 (2Z,4E,7E)-2-hydroxy-6-oxonona-2,4,7-triene-1,9-dioate + H2O  (2Z)-2-hydroxypenta-2,4-dienoate + fumarate

This enzyme catalyses a step in a pathway of phenylpropanoid compounds degradation.

References

External links 

EC 3.7.1